The Agrarian Party (AP) was a political party in Hungary in the inter-war period.

History
The party was first ran in national elections in 1926, when it won three seats in the parliamentary elections that year. It did not contest any further elections.

References

Defunct political parties in Hungary
Agrarian parties in Hungary